Our Survival Depends on Us is a post-metal / doom / sludge band from Salzburg, Austria.

The band was founded in 1999 by Mucho Kolb and Mani Eibner and released the first demo recording Breathe in 2000. After this release Thom Kinberger and Hajot Gmeilbauer (also: Thelema, Sturmpercht) joined OSDOU who had both already played with Kolb in Soulsearch. The band had multiple short time bassists until Barth Resch (formerly: Belphegor) took over permanently before recording their second album.   In 2014 founding member Eibner left OSDOU and the band recruited Thomas Apfelthaler as the new drummer. OSDOU are currently part of the Ván Records' roster.

Members 
 Current members
Mucho Kolb (Vocals, Guitar)
Thom Kinberger (Vocals, Guitar)
Barth Resch (Vocals, Bass)
Hajot Gmeilbauer (Keyboards)
Thomas Apfelthaler (Drums)

 Former members
Mani Eibner (Drums, 1999–2014)

Discography

Studio albums 
 2005: Jumping Once Too Often into the Ocean That Had Always Been Our Inspiration (LP, Mju.org Records)
 2007: Jumping Once Too Often into the Ocean That Had Always Been Our Inspiration (CD-reissue, Womb of Narcotics Records)
 2009: Painful Stories Told with a Passion for Life (CD: Psychedoomelic Records, Vinyl: Totem-Records)
 2015: Scouts on the Borderline Between the Physical and Spiritual World (Ván Records)
 2019: Melting the Ice in the Hearts of Men (Ván Records)

Other 
 2000: Breathe (Demo)
 2009: Der Blutharsch vs. Our Survival Depends on Us – Untitled (7" Single, WKN Records)

References

External links 

 Official website
 Metal Archives
 Discogs.org
 Bandcamp page

Post-metal musical groups
Doom metal musical groups
Sludge metal musical groups
Austrian heavy metal musical groups